The Pilgrim is a live album by the composer Shaun Davey. It was recorded at Festival Interceltique de Lorient, Glasgow Royal Concert Hall.

Background

In 1983, following the successful performance of Shaun Davey's work The Brendan Voyage the previous year, The Festival Interceltique de Lorient commissioned Davey to compose The Lorient Festival Suite for orchestra and Celtic soloists representing the seven Celtic countries or regions (Scotland, Ireland, Isle of Man, Wales, Cornwall, Brittany, Galicia) and it was a recording of this concert that was released, on vinyl, in the same year by Tara Music under the title of The Pilgrim. Despite the success of the initial performance and subsequent LP release Davey realised that the work needed a thread to hold it together. It was not until 1990, when Davey was approached by Glasgow Royal Concert Hall to stage The Pilgrim in Glasgow to mark the passing of the mantle of European City of Culture from Glasgow to Dublin, that he got the chance to address some of these problems. With the commitment to a CD release from Tara Music, he was in a position to add some new pieces (and delete others). He introduced the concept of a journey by St. Colum Cille through the Celtic countries which provided the missing thread from the earlier work. This concept was further strengthened by the introduction of a narrator between the musical pieces.

Recording

The current CD release is a combination of remixed recordings from the original Lorient concert as well as the Glasgow concert.

With a number of performances scheduled for the piece in the millennium year, Shaun took the opportunity to revise and extend the suite. As the overall length of the suite was now beyond that of a conventional CD, the additional tracks were on a later release 'May We Never Have To Goodbye' also on the Tara Music label.

Tracks
  	Himlico's Map; Colm Cille Leaves Derry.
 	Gair Na Gairbe
 	A Walk In The Ocean
 	The Pilgrim
 	Colum Cille's Farewell to Ireland
 	The Land of The Picts
 	Iona
 	Briochan and Columba
 	Storm at Sea
 	A White Wave Foams Over
 	Ymadawiad Arthur
 	St. Manchan's Prayer
 	Samson Peccator Episcopus
 	St. Matthews Point
 	Danse Plin
 	Bal Plin
 	Dance An Dro 	 
 	Santiago
 	Vigo
 	The Deer's Cry
 	God Be With Me
 	A`Ghrian'

Musicians
Conductors : Noel Kelehan / Iain Sutherland
Orchestras : The Lorient Festival Orchestra  / The Glasgow Philharmonic Orchestra
Soloists; Rita Connolly & Iarla O'Lionaird (vocals) Liam O'Flynn uilleann pipes, Josik Allot & Bernard Pichard Bombardes, Pipe Major Tom Anderson (Scottish pipes), Helen Davies (Celtic harp), Carlos Real Rodreguez, Vincente Manuel Tunas.
Narrator : Mick Lally.
Choirs : Cord Gord' rer Garth' Kerensa, An Tryskell, The City of Glasgow Chorus.
Pipebands : Wallacestone Pipeband. City of Glasgow Pipes and Drums.

References
 Record Label Catalogue 2010
 Album Sleevenotes 
 Album press release

1983 live albums
Shaun Davey albums